North Vietnam, officially the Democratic Republic of Vietnam (DRV), was a socialist country supported by the Soviet Union (USSR) and the People's Republic of China (PRC) in Southeast Asia that existed from 1945 to 1976 and the country was recognized in 1954. Both the North Vietnamese and South Vietnamese states ceased to exist when they unified as the Socialist Republic of Vietnam. 

During the August Revolution following World War II, Vietnamese communist revolutionary Hồ Chí Minh, leader of the Việt Minh Front, declared independence on 2 September 1945, announcing the creation of the Democratic Republic of Vietnam. The Việt Minh ("League for the Independence of Vietnam"), led by communists, was created in 1941 and designed to appeal to a wider population than the Indochinese Communist Party could command.

From the very beginning, the DRV regime sought to consolidate power by purging other nationalist movements. Meanwhile, France moved in to reassert its colonial dominance over Vietnam. After the communist-led Việt Minh severely eliminated non-communist nationalist organizations, the First Indochina War burst out between the Việt Minh and the French in December 1946. During this guerrilla war, the Việt Minh captured and controlled most of the rural areas in Vietnam which led to French defeat in 1954. The negotiations in the Geneva Conference that year ended the war and recognized Vietnamese independence. The Geneva Accords provisionally divided the country into a northern and a southern zone along the 17th parallel, stipulating general elections scheduled for July 1956 to "bring about the unification of Viet-Nam". The northern zone was controlled by the Democratic Republic of Vietnam and became commonly called North Vietnam, while the southern zone, under control of the de jure non-communist State of Vietnam was commonly called South Vietnam.

Supervision of the implementation of the Geneva Accords was the responsibility of an international commission consisting of India, Canada, and Poland, respectively representing the non-aligned, the capitalist, and the communist blocs. The United States, however, did not sign the Geneva Accords and stated that it "shall continue to seek to achieve unity through free elections supervised by the United Nations to ensure that they are conducted fairly". The State of Vietnam strongly opposed the partition of the country. In July 1955, its prime minister, Ngô Đình Diệm, announced that South Vietnam would not participate in elections, claiming that the State of Vietnam had not signed the Geneva Accords and was therefore not bound by it, and raising concerns that an unfree election would occur under the communist regime in North Vietnam.

Failure to unify the country by referendum led to the Vietnam War in 1955. The North Vietnamese People's Army of Vietnam and the South Vietnam-based Việt Cộng guerrilla fought against the military of South Vietnam (by then the Republic of Vietnam) and were backed by their communist allies, mainly China and the Soviet Union. To prevent other countries from becoming communist in Southeast Asia, the United States intervened in the conflict along with other capitalist forces from South Korea, Australia and Thailand, who heavily supported South Vietnam militarily. The conflict spread to neighboring countries and North Vietnam supported the Pathet Lao in Laos and the Khmer Rouge in Cambodia against their respective US-backed governments. By 1973 the United States and its allies had been forced to withdraw from the war, and the unsupported South Vietnam was swiftly overrun by the superior Northern forces.

The Vietnam War ended on 30 April 1975 and saw South Vietnam come under the control of a Provisional Revolutionary Government, which led to the reunification of Vietnam on 2 July 1976, creating the Socialist Republic of Vietnam of today. The expanded Socialist Republic retained North Vietnam's political culture under Soviet influence and continued its existing memberships in international organisations such as COMECON.

Etymology

The official name of the North Vietnamese state was the "Democratic Republic of Vietnam". The South was known as the "Republic of Vietnam".

Việt Nam was the name adopted by Emperor Gia Long in 1804. It is a variation of "Nam Việt" (南 越, Southern Việt), a name used in ancient times. In 1839, Emperor Minh Mạng renamed the country Đại Nam ("Great South"). In 1945, the nation's official name was changed back to "Vietnam". The name is also sometimes rendered as "Viet Nam" in English. The term "North Vietnam" became common usage in 1954, when the Geneva Conference provisionally partitioned Vietnam into communist and non-communist parts.

History

Leadership under Hồ Chí Minh (1945–1969)

Proclamation of the republic

After about 300 years of partition by feudal dynasties, Vietnam was again under one single authority in 1802 when Gia Long founded the Nguyễn dynasty, but the country became a French protectorate after 1883 and under Japanese occupation after 1940 during World War II. Soon after Japan surrendered on 2 September 1945, the Việt Minh in the August Revolution entered Hanoi, and the Democratic Republic of Vietnam was proclaimed on 2 September 1945 establishing a new government for the entire country replacing the Nguyễn dynasty. Hồ Chí Minh became leader of the Democratic Republic of Vietnam. U.S. President Franklin D. Roosevelt was opposed to a return to French rule in Indochina, and the U.S. was supportive of the Viet Minh at this time.

Early republic
The Democratic Republic of Vietnam under Ho Chi Minh claimed dominion over all of Vietnam, but during this time Southern Vietnam was in profound political disorder. The successive collapse of French, then Japanese power, followed by the dissension among the political factions in Saigon had been accompanied by widespread violence in the countryside. On 16 August 1945, Hồ Chí Minh organized the National Congress in Tân Trào. The Congress adopted 10 major policies of the Việt Minh, passing the General Uprising Order, selecting the national flag of Vietnam, choosing the national anthem and selecting the National Committee for the Liberation of Vietnam, which later became the Provisional Revolutionary Government led by Hồ Chí Minh. On 12 September 1945, the first British troops arrived in Saigon, and on 23 September 28 days after the people of Saigon seized political power, French troops occupied the police stations, the post office, and other public buildings. The salient political fact of life in Northern Vietnam was that the Chinese Nationalist Army occupied it, and the Chinese presence had forced Ho Chi Minh and the Viet Minh to accommodate Chinese-backed Viet Nationalists. In June 1946, Chinese Nationalist troops evacuated Hanoi, and on 15 June, the last detachments embarked at Haiphong. After the departure of the British in 1946, the French controlled a part of Cochinchina, South Central Coast, Central Highlands since the end to the Southern Resistance War. In January 1946, the Viet Minh held an nationwide election across all the provinces to establish a National Assembly. Public enthusiasm for this event suggests that the Viet Minh enjoyed a great deal of popularity at this time, although there were few competitive races and the party makeup of the Assembly was determined in advance of the vote. Despite not joining the election, Việt Cách and Việt Quốc gained 70 seats in the National Assembly for establishing the unified government.

In September 1945, the Việt Minh held secret meetings with Vietnamese Revolutionary League (Việt Cách) (18 September 1945) and Vietnamese Nationalist Party (Việt Quốc) (19 September 1945). In these two meetings, Nguyễn Hải Thần represented Việt Cách and Nguyễn Tường Tam represent Việt Quốc. Hồ Chí Minh agreed to unite the Việt Minh with Việt Cách and Việt Quốc. Thus, the Government of the Democratic Republic of Vietnam led by the Việt Minh would receive the financial and political support of the Republic of China. For this proposal, within the Việt Minh there were many different opinions. Võ Nguyên Giáp disagreed with the suggestion that the proposals were not valid and not honest, as if replacing French colonialism with Chinese domination, but Hoàng Minh Giám thought that the unification of Vietnam with the Nationalist parties will reduce opposition and strengthen the power of the Việt Minh, as the Chinese are relieved and the French have to worry. Eventually the Việt Minh under Hồ Chí Minh refused to merge with the Pro-Chinese Việt Cách and the Việt Quốc League.

On 6 January 1946, President Hồ Chí Minh held the nationwide General Election which voted for the first time and passed the Constitution. Many parties did not have the right to participate in General Elections seeking to undermine. These parties claimed to be the only Việt Minh communist, the government in the hands of the Việt Minh want anyone to win it. The two opposition parties in the government are the Vietnamese Nationalist Party (Việt Quốc) and the Vietnam Cách mệnh Đồng minh (Việt Cách) did not participate in the election although Hồ Chí Minh previously sent a letter to Nguyễn Hải Thần leader of Việt Cách and Vũ Hồng Khanh leader of Việt Quốc. Hồ Chí Minh invited Việt Quốc and Việt Cách to attend the General Election and urged the two sides not to attack each other with words or actions until the Congress opens. Former Prime Minister Trần Trọng Kim said there were places where people were forced to vote for the Việt Minh. According to the Việt Minh, the election was fair. Despite being campaigned by many parties to campaign for the people to boycott the election and block the election in some places, where there are self-nominated candidates, publicly run, free elections are taking place everywhere. After the election results are announced, the truth is not the same as the propaganda parties. Many prestigious delegates of classes, religions and ethnic groups were elected in the First National Assembly, most of them not party members.

The presence of Chiang Kai-shek's army up to that time ensured the survival of Việt Quốc and Việt Cách. These two parties did not have a cohesive program to enlist the people like the Việt Minh. The leaders of the Vietnamese Nationalist Party and the Việt Cách Revolutionary Party are far from having comparable qualities with Hồ Chí Minh, Võ Nguyên Giáp, and other responsible Việt Minh members. When the Chinese nationalist army withdrew from Vietnam on 15 June 1946, in one way or another, Võ Nguyễn Giáp decided that the Việt Minh had to completely control the government. Võ Nguyễn Giáp is in immediate action with the goal of spreading Việt Minh leadership: the Allied Powers are supported by the Vietnamese Nationalist Party (according to Cecil B. Currey, this organization borrows the revolutionary name of Vietnamese Nationalist Party of 1930 was founded by Nguyễn Thái Học and, according to David G. Marr, the Vietnamese Communist Party under Hồ Chí Minh tried to ban the Vietnamese Nationalist Party betraying the revolutionary cause of Nguyễn Thái Học in 1930. By the end of 1945, many people still did not believe in it.) Võ Nguyễn Giáp gradually sought to phase out opposition such as the pro-Japan nationalist groups, the Trotskyists, the anti-French nationalists, and the Catholic group called "Catholic soldiers". On 19 June 1946, the Việt Minh Journal reportedly vehemently criticized "reactionaries sabotage the Franco-Vietnamese preliminary agreement on 6 March". Shortly thereafter, Võ Nguyễn Giáp began a campaign to pursue opposition parties by police and military forces controlled by the Việt Minh with the help of the French authorities. He also used soldiers, Japanese officers who had volunteered to stay in Vietnam and some of the supplies provided by France (in Hòn Gai French troops provided the Việt Minh with cannons to kill some of the positions commanded by the Great Occupation) in this campaign.

When France declared Cochinchina, the southern third of Vietnam, a separate state as the "Autonomous Republic of Cochinchina" in June 1946, Vietnamese nationalists reacted with fury. In November, the National Assembly adopted the first Constitution of the Republic.

During the First Indochina War

In the wake of the Hai Phong incident and the deterioration of the Fontainebleau Agreements, the French reoccupied Hanoi  and the First Indochina War (1946–54) followed, during which many urban areas fell under French control. Following the Chinese Communist Revolution (1946–50), Chinese communist forces arrived on the border in 1949. Chinese aid revived the fortunes of the Viet Minh and transformed it from a guerrilla militia into a standing army. The outbreak of the Korean War in June 1950 transformed what had been an anti-colonial struggle into a Cold War battleground, with the U.S. providing financial support to the French.

Provisional military demarcation of Vietnam

Following the partition of Vietnam in 1954 at the end of the First Indochina War, more than one million North Vietnamese migrated to South Vietnam, under the U.S.-led evacuation campaign named Operation Passage to Freedom, with an estimated 60% of the north's one million Catholics fleeing south. The Catholic migration is attributed to an expectation of persecution of Catholics by the North Vietnamese government, as well as publicity employed by the Saigon government of the President Ngo Dinh Diem. The CIA ran a propaganda campaign to get Catholics to come to the south. However Colonel Edward Lansdale, the man credited with the campaign, rejected the notion that his campaign had much effect on popular sentiment. The Viet Minh sought to detain or otherwise prevent would-be refugees from leaving, such as through intimidation through military presence, shutting down ferry services and water traffic, or prohibiting mass gatherings. Concurrently, between 14,000 and 45,000 civilians and approximately 100,000 Viet Minh fighters moved in the opposite direction.

Presidency of Tôn Đức Thắng (1969–1976)

During the Vietnam War

Reunification
After the fall of Saigon on 30 April 1975, the Provisional Revolutionary Government of the Republic of South Vietnam, or Vietcong, alongside the North Vietnamese Army, governed South Vietnam for the next year. However it was seen as a vassal government of North Vietnam. North and South Vietnam were officially reunited on 2 July 1976 as the Socialist Republic of Vietnam. The merged country's government was dominated by holdovers from North Vietnam, and adopted the North Vietnamese constitution, flag and anthem.

Land reform

Land reform was an integral part of the Viet Minh and communist Democratic Republic of Vietnam.  A Viet Minh Land Reform Law of 4 December 1953 called for (1) confiscation of land belonging to landlords who were enemies of the regime; (2) requisition of land from landlords not judged to be enemies; and (3) purchase with payment in bonds.  The land reform was carried out from 1953 to 1956. Some farming areas did not undergo land reform but only rent reduction and the highland areas occupied by minority peoples were not substantially impacted.  Some land was retained by the government but most was distributed without payment with priority given to Viet Minh fighters and their families.  The total number of rural people impacted by the land reform program was more than 4 million.  The rent reduction program impacted nearly 8 million people.

Results
The land reform program was a success in terms of distributing much land to poor and landless peasants and reducing or eliminating the land holdings of landlords (địa chủ) and rich peasants. By 1960, there were 40,000 cooperatives spanning nearly nine-tenths of all farmland. The program, proceeded by a Three Year Plan (1957-1960), lifted agricultural production to 5.4 million tonnes or over double pre-Indochina War levels. 

However, it was carried out with violence and repression primarily directed against large landowners identified, sometimes incorrectly, as landlords. On 18 August 1956, North Vietnamese leader Ho Chi Minh acknowledged the serious errors the government had made in the land reform program. Too many farmers, he said, had been incorrectly classified as "landlords" and executed or imprisoned and too many mistakes had been made in redistributing land. Severe rioting protesting the excesses of the land reform program broke out in November 1956 in one largely Catholic rural district.  About 1,000 people were killed or injured and several thousand imprisoned. Democratic Republic of Vietnam initiated a "correction campaign" which by 1958 had resulted in the return of land to many of those harmed by the land reform. As part of the correction campaign as many as 23,748 political prisoners were released by North Vietnam by September 1957.

Executions
Executions and imprisonment of persons classified as "landlords" or enemies of the state were contemplated from the beginning of the land reform program.  A Politburo document dated 4 May 1953 said that executions were "fixed in principle at the ratio of one per one thousand people of the total population." The number of persons actually executed by communist cadre carrying out the land reform program has been variously estimated. Some estimates of those killed range up to 200,000.  Other scholarship has concluded that the higher estimates were based on political propaganda emanating from South Vietnam and that the actual total of those executed was probably much lower.  Scholar Edwin E. Moise estimated the total number of executions at between 3,000 and 15,000 and later came up with a more precise figure of 13,500.  Moise's conclusions were supported by documents of diplomats from Hungary (occupied by the Soviet Union), living in Democratic Republic of Vietnam at the time of the land reform. Author Michael Lind in a 2013 book gives a similar estimate of "at least ten or fifteen thousand" executed.

Collective farming
The ultimate objective of the land reform program of the Democratic Republic of Vietnam government was not to achieve equitable distribution of farmland but rather the organization of all farmers into co-operatives in which land and other factors of agricultural production would be owned and used collectively.
The first steps after the 1953–1956 land reform were the encouragement by the government of labor exchanges in which farmers would unite to exchange labor; secondly in 1958 and 1959 was the formation of "low level cooperatives" in which farmers cooperated in production.  By 1961, 86 percent of farmers were members of low-level cooperatives. The third step beginning in 1961 was to organize "high level cooperatives", true collective farming in which land and resources were utilized collectively without individual ownership of land. By 1971, the great majority of farmers in North Vietnam were organized into high-level cooperatives. After the reunification of Vietnam, collective farms were abandoned gradually in the 1980s and 1990s.

Administrative divisions

Autonomous regions 

North Vietnam established a system of autonomous regions (Vietnamese: Khu tự trị) similar to (and based on) the autonomous regions of China. In recognising the traditional separatism of tribal minorities, this policy of accommodationism gave them self-government in exchange for acceptance of Hanoi’s control. These regions existed from 1955 but following the merger of the Democratic Republic of Vietnam and the Republic of South Vietnam the system of autonomous regions wasn't continued and were fully abolished by 1978.

List of North Vietnamese autonomous regions and their subsidiary provinces:

 Thái-Mèo Autonomous Region (Khu tự trị Thái – Mèo, 1955–1962), later renamed Northwestern Autonomous Region (Khu tự trị Tây Bắc, 1962–1975) 
 Lai Châu  
 Sơn La 
 Nghĩa Lộ 
 Việt Bắc Autonomous Region (Khu tự trị Việt Bắc), established in 1956. 
 Cao Bằng 
 Lạng Sơn 
 Thái Nguyên  
 Bắc Cạn  
 Hà Giang  
 Tuyên Quang 
 Lào-Hà-Yên Autonomous Region (Khu tự trị Lào-Hà-Yên), established in 1957.

Foreign relations

South Vietnam

From 1960, the North Vietnamese government went to war with the Republic of Vietnam via its proxy the Viet Cong, in an attempt to annex South Vietnam and reunify Vietnam under a communist party. North Vietnamese and Viet Cong forces and supplies were sent along the Ho Chi Minh trail. In 1964 the United States sent combat troops to South Vietnam to support the South Vietnamese government, but the U.S. had advisors there since 1950. Other nations, including Australia, the Republic of Korea, Thailand and New Zealand also contributed troops and military aid to South Vietnam's war effort. China, DPRK and the Soviet Union provided aid to and troops in support of North Vietnamese military activities. This was known as the Vietnam War, or the American War in Vietnam itself (1955–75). In addition to the Viet Cong in South Vietnam, other communist insurgencies also operated within neighboring Kingdom of Laos and Khmer Republic, both formerly part of the French colonial territory of Indochina. These were the Pathet Lao and the Khmer Rouge, respectively. These insurgencies were aided by the North Vietnamese government, which sent troops to fight alongside them.

Communist and capitalist states 

The Democratic Republic of Vietnam was diplomatically isolated by many capitalist states, and many other anti-communist states worldwide throughout most of the North's history, as these states extended recognition only to the anti-communist government of South Vietnam. North Vietnam however, was recognized by almost all Communist countries, such as the Soviet Union and other Socialist countries of Eastern Europe and Central Asia, China, North Korea, and Cuba, and received aid from these nations. North Vietnam refused to establish diplomatic relations with Yugoslavia from 1950 to 1957, perhaps reflecting Hanoi's deference to the Soviet line on the Yugoslav government of Josip Broz Tito, and North Vietnamese officials continued to be critical of Tito after relations were established. 

Several non-aligned countries also recognized North Vietnam. Similar to India, most accorded North Vietnam de facto rather than de jure (formal) recognition. In the case of Algeria however, relations between the DRV and Algeria were much closer as a result of clandestine weapon transfers from the former to the latter during the Algerian War, with Algeria placing a draft resolution in the 1973 summit of the Non-Aligned Movement calling on its members to support the DRV and PRG.

In 1969, Sweden became the first Western country to extend full diplomatic recognition to North Vietnam. Many other Western countries followed suit in the 1970s, such as the government of Australia under Gough Whitlam. By December 1972, 49 countries had established diplomatic relations with North Vietnam, and in 1973 more countries such as France established or reestablished their relations with the DRV.

Japan  

  

Despite there not being any official diplomatic ties between Japan and North Vietnam between 1954 and 1973, private exchanges were gradually being rebuilt. In March 1955 the Japanese Japan–Vietnam Friendship Association was created and in August of that year the Japan–Vietnam Trade Association was established. Meanwhile, in 1965 North Vietnamese Vietnam–Japan Friendship Association would be established to help maintain unofficial relations between the two countries.

During the Vietnam War of the 1960s and 1970s, Japan consistently encouraged a negotiated settlement at the earliest possible date. Even before the hostilities ended, it had made contact with the Democratic Republic of Vietnam (North Vietnam) government and had reached an agreement to establish diplomatic relations in September 1973. On 21 September 1973, Japan and the Democratic Republic of Vietnam (North Vietnam) signed the "Exchange of Notes Concerning the Establishment of Diplomatic Relations Between Japan and the Democratic Republic of Vietnam" in Paris, this document was in the French language and restored the diplomatic relations between Japan and North Vietnam. On the Japanese side the document was signed by Yoshihiro Nakayama, the Japanese Ambassador to France, while for the North Vietnamese side the document was signed by the Charge d'Affaires ad interim of North Vietnam to France Võ Văn Sung. Implementation, however, was delayed by North Vietnamese demands that Japan pay the equivalent of US$45 million in World War II reparations in two yearly installments, in the form of "economic cooperation" grants. Giving in to the Vietnamese demands, Japan paid the money and opened an embassy in Hanoi on 11 October 1975, following the unification of North Vietnam and South Vietnam into the Socialist Republic of Vietnam. 

Earlier, the Japanese already gave similar funding to the South Vietnamese, which also re-established official diplomatic relations with Japan during the same period. 

With the re-establishment of relations between Japan and North Vietnam the Japanese agreed to resolve what are termed "unsolved problems", which after earlier negotiations in Vientiane, Kingdom of Laos, these "unsolved problems" revolved around grants given by the Japanese State to North Vietnam. Between 1973 and 1975 the Japanese and North Vietnamese governments held over 20 both official and unofficial meetings, on 6 October 1975 both sides finally reached and agreement and the Japanese would provide the North Vietnamese with an endowment worth 13.5 billion yen. Of this money, 8.5 billion yen would be used to purchase heavy farmland cultivation machinery as well as public works provided by Japanese-owned corporations. 

After diplomatic relations were re-established, in 1975, Japan would open an embassy in Hanoi and North Vietnam would open an embassy in Tokyo.

See also
 Captive Nations

Notes

References

Further reading

External links
 
 Declaration of Independence of the Democratic Republic of Vietnam 

 
Former countries in Vietnamese history
Communism in Vietnam
History of Vietnam
First Indochina War
Indochina Wars
Vietnam War
Vietnam
States and territories established in 1945
States and territories disestablished in 1976
1945 establishments in Vietnam
1976 disestablishments in Vietnam
Former countries in Southeast Asia